Kerststol is a traditional Dutch oval-shaped fruited Christmas bread. The yeast-based bread contains dried fruits, raisins and currants, lemon and orange zest, water, milk, butter, sugar, vanilla and cinnamon. A more luxurious variety may include chopped walnuts, almonds, or hazelnuts. Ginger powder or grated crystallized ginger, dried cherries and cranberries, apple, kiwi or cardamom may also be added to this pastry dough.

The dough, after resting, is filled with an almond paste (amandelspijs) log which is placed in the middle of the cake. The dough is folded over the almond paste lengthways and gently pinched to seal it. When ready, the cake is dusted with icing sugar before being served in thick slices, spread with butter.

Paasstol
There is a cake of this type also for Easter. Then it is called paasstol or paasbrood.

See also
Stollen
Dutch cuisine

References    

Dutch confectionery
Yeast breads
Sweet breads
Christmas food
Easter bread